The title of Tom Zé's 2005 release, Estudando o Pagode, literally means "studying pagode" (the subgenre of samba). This album is a three-act operetta about women and their relationship to men. Zé refers to the album as being masculist in that "it calls man's attention to the huge disadvantage he has created in his present relationship with women."1 As is common in Zé's music, this album incorporates novel sounds such as a braying donkey and those created from an instrument made out of ficus (fig) leaves.

Track listing
 "Ave Dor Maria" – 3:27
 "Estúpido Rapaz" – 3:23
 "Proposta de Amor" – 2:24
 "Quero Pensar (A Mulher de Bath)" – 4:01
 "Mulher Navio Negreiro" – 5:01
 "Pagode-Enredo dos Tempos do Medo" – 4:10
 "Canção de Nora (Casa de Bonecas)" – 1:47
 "O Amor é Um Rock" – 4:14
 "Duas Opinioes" – 4:46
 "Elaeu" – 4:33
 "Vibração da Carne" – 3:38
 "Para lá do Pará" – 4:02
 "Prazer Carnal" – 4:40
 "Teatro (Dom Quixote)" – 4:52
 "A Volta do Trem das Onze (8.5 Milhões de km²)" – 5:06
 "Beatles a Granel" – 3:23

Release history

References

 Tangari, Joe. "Interview: Tom Zé", Pitchfork Media, 2006-10-31.

2005 albums
Tom Zé albums
Luaka Bop albums
Avant-pop albums